Bruno Umile (born 6 February 2003) is an Italian football player. He plays for Benevento.

Club career
He made his Serie B debut for Benevento on 13 January 2022 in a game against Monza.

International career
He was first called up to represent his country in 2018 for Under-15 friendlies. In the next year, he was called up to the Under-16 squad.

References

External links
 

2003 births
Living people
Italian footballers
Italy youth international footballers
Association football forwards
Benevento Calcio players
Serie B players